North Tyneside Council is the local authority of North Tyneside in Tyne and Wear, England. It is a metropolitan district council, one of five in Tyne and Wear and one of 36 in the metropolitan counties of England, and provides the majority of local government services in North Tyneside.

History
The current local authority was first elected in 1973, a year before formally coming into its powers and prior to the creation of the Metropolitan Borough of North Tyneside on 1 April 1974. The council held its meetings at Wallsend Town Hall until it moved to new premises at Cobalt Business Park in 2008.

Political control

Since 2002 the council has had a Directly elected mayor, which means the party with an overall majority of councillors may not be the same party exercising executive functions. Since 2013, the mayor of North Tyneside post has been held by Norma Redfearn of the Labour Party. Her predecessor was Linda Arkley of the Conservative Party.

References

Metropolitan district councils of England
Local authorities in Tyne and Wear
Mayor and cabinet executives
Local education authorities in England
Billing authorities in England
Council